Marjan Belčev (born 22 October 1982) is a Macedonian football defender who was recently played for FK Teteks.

References

External sources
 Profile at MacedonianFootball

1982 births
Living people
Footballers from Skopje
Association football defenders
Macedonian footballers
North Macedonia under-21 international footballers
FK Vardar players
FK Cementarnica 55 players
FK Makedonija Gjorče Petrov players
Esteghlal Ahvaz players
FK Teteks players
KS Shkumbini Peqin players
FK Bregalnica Štip players
Ayeyawady United F.C. players
Macedonian First Football League players
Persian Gulf Pro League players
Kategoria Superiore players
Myanmar National League players
Macedonian expatriate footballers
Expatriate footballers in Iran
Macedonian expatriate sportspeople in Iran
Expatriate footballers in Albania
Macedonian expatriate sportspeople in Albania
Expatriate footballers in Myanmar
Macedonian expatriate sportspeople in Myanmar